Bović is a village in central Croatia, in the municipality of Gvozd, Sisak-Moslavina County. It is connected by the D6 highway.

Demographics
According to the 2011 census, the village of Bović has 91 inhabitants. This represents 29.07% of its pre-war population, according to the 1991 census.

According to the 1991 census,  97.13% of the village population were ethnic Serbs (304/313),  0.95% were ethnic Croats (3/313), while 1.92% were of other ethnic origin (6/313).

References

Populated places in Sisak-Moslavina County
Serb communities in Croatia